Philiris unipunctata is a species of butterfly of the family Lycaenidae. It is found in from West Irian to Papua New Guinea.

References

Butterflies described in 1908
Luciini